Oxandrolone, sold under the brand names Oxandrin and Anavar, among others, is an androgen and anabolic steroid (AAS) medication which is used to help promote weight gain in various situations, to help offset protein catabolism caused by long-term corticosteroid therapy, to support recovery from severe burns, to treat bone pain associated with osteoporosis, to aid in the development of girls with Turner syndrome, and for other indications. It is taken by mouth.

Side effects of oxandrolone include symptoms of masculinization such as acne, increased hair growth, voice changes, and increased sexual desire. The drug is a synthetic androgen and anabolic steroid, hence is an agonist of the androgen receptor (AR), the biological target of androgens such as testosterone and dihydrotestosterone. It has strong anabolic effects and weak androgenic effects, which give it a mild side effect profile and make it especially suitable for use in women.

Oxandrolone was first described in 1962 and was introduced for medical use in 1964. It is used mostly in the United States. In addition to its medical use, oxandrolone is used to improve physique and performance. The drug is a controlled substance in many countries, so nonmedical use is generally illicit.

Medical uses
Oxandrolone has been researched and prescribed as a treatment for a wide variety of conditions. It is FDA-approved for treating bone pain associated with osteoporosis, aiding weight gain following surgery or physical trauma, during chronic infection, or in the context of unexplained weight loss, and counteracting the catabolic effect of long-term corticosteroid therapy., it is often prescribed off-label to quicken recovery from severe burns, aid the development of girls with Turner syndrome, and counteract HIV/AIDS-induced wasting. Oxandrolone improves both short-term and long-term outcomes in people recovering from severe burns and is well-established as a safe treatment for this indication. It is also used in the treatment of idiopathic short stature, anemia, hereditary angioedema, alcoholic hepatitis, and hypogonadism.

Medical research has established the effectiveness of oxandrolone in aiding the development of girls with Turner syndrome. Although oxandrolone has long been used to accelerate growth in children with idiopathic short stature, it is unlikely to increase adult height, and in some cases may even decrease it . Oxandrolone has, therefore, largely been replaced by growth hormone for this use. However, a 2019 systematic review comparing effects of adding oxandrolone to growth hormone treatment to growth hormone alone has found moderate-quality evidence that the addition of oxandrolone leads to an increase in final adult height of girls with Turner syndrome, and low-quality evidence showed no increase in adverse effects. When the same review assessed the effects of adding Oxandrolone to growth hormone treatment on speech, cognition and psychological status, the results were inconclusive due to very-low quality evidence. Children with idiopathic short stature or Turner syndrome are given doses of oxandrolone far smaller than those given to people with burns  to minimize the likelihood of virilization and premature maturation.

Non-medical uses
Many bodybuilders and athletes use oxandrolone illicitly for its muscle-building effects. It is much more anabolic than androgenic, so women and those seeking less intense steroid regimens use it particularly often. Many also value oxandrolone's low hepatotoxicity relative to most other orally active AASs.

Contraindications
Like other AASs, oxandrolone may worsen hypercalcemia by increasing osteolytic bone resorption. When taken by pregnant women, oxandrolone may have unintended effects such as masculinization on the fetus.

Side effects

Women who are administered oxandrolone may experience virilization, irreversible development of masculine features such as voice deepening, hirsutism, menstruation abnormalities, male-pattern hair loss, and clitoral enlargement. Oxandrolone may disrupt growth in children, reducing their adult height. Because of these side effects, doses given to women and children are minimized and people are usually monitored for virilization and growth abnormalities. Like other androgens, oxandrolone can cause or worsen acne and priapism (unwanted or prolonged erections). Oxandrolone can also reduce males' fertility, another side effect common among androgens. In an attempt to compensate for the exogenous increase in androgens, the body may reduce testosterone production via testicular atrophy and inhibition of gonadotropic activity.

Unlike some AASs, oxandrolone does not generally cause gynecomastia because it is not aromatized into estrogenic metabolites. However, although no reports of gynecomastia were made in spite of widespread use, oxandrolone was reported in a publication in 1991 to have been associated with 33 cases of gynecomastia in adolescent boys treated with it for short stature. The gynecomastia developed during oxandrolone therapy in 19 of the boys and after the therapy was completed in 14 of the boys, and 10 of the boys had transient gynecomastia, while 23 had persistent gynecomastia that necessitated mastectomy. Though transient gynecomastia is a natural and common occurrence in pubertal boys, the gynecomastia associated with oxandrolone was of a late/delayed onset and was persistent in a high percentage of the cases. As such, the researchers stated, "although oxandrolone cannot be implicated as stimulatory [in] gynecomastia", a possible relationship should be considered in clinicians using oxandrolone in adolescents for growth stimulation.

Uniquely among 17α-alkylated AASs, oxandrolone shows little to no hepatotoxicity, even at high doses. No cases of severe hepatotoxicity have been singularly attributed to oxandrolone. However, elevated liver enzymes have been observed in some people, particularly with high doses and/or prolonged treatment, although they return to normal ranges following discontinuation.

Interactions 

Oxandrolone greatly increases warfarin's blood-thinning effect, sometimes dangerously so. In April 2004, Savient Pharmaceuticals published a safety alert through the FDA warning healthcare professionals of this. Oxandrolone can also inhibit the metabolism of oral hypoglycemic agents. It may worsen edema when taken alongside corticosteroids or adrenocorticotropic hormone.

Pharmacology

Pharmacodynamics

Like other AASs, oxandrolone is an agonist of the androgen receptor, similar to androgens such as testosterone and DHT. The relative binding affinity of oxandrolone for the androgen receptor is about 0.3% of that of metribolone. Activation of the androgen receptor stimulates protein synthesis, which increases muscle growth, lean body mass, and bone mineral density.

Compared to testosterone and many other AASs, oxandrolone is less androgenic relative to its strength as an anabolic. Oxandrolone has about 322 to 633% of the anabolic potency and 24% of the androgenic potency of methyltestosterone. Similarly, oxandrolone has as much as 6 times the anabolic potency of testosterone and has significantly reduced androgenic potency in comparison. The reduced ratio of anabolic to androgenic activity of oxandrolone often motivates its medical use in children and women because less androgenic effect implies less risk of virilization. The bodybuilding community also considers this fact when choosing between AASs.

As oxandrolone is already 5α-reduced, it is not a substrate for 5α-reductase, hence is not potentiated in androgenic tissues such as the skin, hair follicles, and prostate gland. This is involved in its reduced ratio of anabolic to androgenic activity. Due to the substitution of one of the carbon atoms with an oxygen atom at the C2 position in the A ring, oxandrolone is resistant to inactivation by 3α-hydroxysteroid dehydrogenase in skeletal muscle. This is in contrast to DHT, and is thought to underlie the preserved anabolic potency with oxandrolone. Because it is 5α-reduced, oxandrolone is not a substrate for aromatase, hence cannot be aromatized into metabolites with estrogenic activity. Oxandrolone similarly possesses no progestogenic activity.

Oxandrolone is, uniquely, far less hepatotoxic than other 17α-alkylated AASs, which may be due to differences in metabolism.

Pharmacokinetics
The oral bioavailability of oxandrolone is 97%. Its plasma protein binding is 94 to 97%. The drug is metabolized primarily by the kidneys and to a lesser extent by the liver. Oxandrolone is the only AAS that is not primarily or extensively metabolized by the liver, and this is thought to be related to its diminished hepatotoxicity relative to other AASs. Its elimination half-life is reported as 9.4 to 10.4 hours, but is extended to 13.3 hours in the elderly. About 28% of an oral dose of oxandrolone is eliminated unchanged in the urine and 3% is excreted in the feces.

Chemistry

Oxandrolone is a synthetic androstane steroid and a 17α-alkylated derivative of DHT. It is also known as 2-oxa-17α-methyl-5α-dihydrotestosterone (2-oxa-17α-methyl-DHT) or as 2-oxa-17α-methyl-5α-androstan-17β-ol-3-one, and is DHT with a methyl group at the C17α position and the C2 carbon replaced with an oxygen atom. Closely related AASs include the marketed AAS mestanolone (17α-methyl-DHT), oxymetholone (2-hydroxymethylene-17α-methyl-DHT), and stanozolol (a 2,3-pyrazole A ring-fused derivative of 17α-methyl-DHT) and the never-marketed/designer AAS desoxymethyltestosterone (3-deketo-17α-methyl-δ2-DHT), methasterone (2α,17α-dimethyl-DHT), methyl-1-testosterone (17α-methyl-δ1-DHT), and methylstenbolone (2,17α-dimethyl-δ1-DHT).

History
Oxandrolone was first made by Raphael Pappo and Christopher J. Jung while at Searle Laboratories (now part of Pfizer). The researchers first described the drug in 1962. They were immediately interested in oxandrolone's very weak androgenic effects relative to its anabolic effects. It was introduced as a pharmaceutical drug in the United States in 1964.

The drug was prescribed to promote muscle regrowth in disorders which cause involuntary weight loss, and is used as part of treatment for HIV/AIDS. It had also been shown to be partially successful in treating cases of osteoporosis. However, in part due to bad publicity from its illicit use by bodybuilders, production of Anavar was discontinued by Searle Laboratories in 1989. It was picked up by Bio-Technology General Corporation, which changed its name to Savient Pharmaceuticals, which following successful clinical trials in 1995, released it under the brand name Oxandrin. BTG subsequently won approvals for orphan drug status by the Food and Drug Administration for treating alcoholic hepatitis, Turner syndrome, and HIV-induced weight loss. It is also indicated as an offset to protein catabolism caused by long-term administration of corticosteroids.

Society and culture

Generic names

Brand names
The original brand name of oxandrolone was Anavar, which was marketed in the United States and the Netherlands. This product was eventually discontinued and replaced in the United States with a new product named Oxandrin, which is the sole remaining brand name for oxandrolone in the United States. Oxandrolone has also been sold under the brand names Antitriol (Spain), Anatrophill (France), Lipidex (Brazil), Lonavar (Argentina, Australia, Italy), Protivar, and Vasorome (Japan), among others. Additional brand names exist for products that are manufactured for the steroid black market.

Among those using oxandrolone for nonmedical purposes, it is often referred to colloquially as "Var", a shortened form of the brand name Anavar.

Availability

United States

Oxandrolone is one of the few AASs that remains available for medical use in the United States. The others (as of November 2017) are testosterone, testosterone cypionate, testosterone enanthate, testosterone undecanoate, methyltestosterone, fluoxymesterone, and oxymetholone.

Other countries
Outside of the United States, the availability of oxandrolone is quite limited. With the exception of Moldova, it is no longer available in Europe. Oxandrolone is available in some less-regulated markets in Asia such as Malaysia. It is also available in Mexico. Historically, oxandrolone has been marketed in Argentina, Australia, Brazil, France, Italy, Japan, and Spain, but it appears to no longer be available in these countries.

Legal status

In the United States, oxandrolone is categorized as a Schedule III controlled substance under the Controlled Substances Act along with many other AASs. It is a Schedule IV controlled substance in Canada, and a Schedule 4 controlled drug in the United Kingdom.

Doping in sports

Oxandrolone is sometimes used as a doping agent in sports.  Cases of doping with oxandrolone by professional athletes have been reported.

References

External links 
 Oxandrin Homepage, savientpharma.com (via archive.org)
 Oxandrin Label, fda.gov (retrieved 23 October 2009)
 

Androgens and anabolic steroids
Androstanes
Appetite stimulants
Hepatotoxins
Delta-lactones
Tertiary alcohols
World Anti-Doping Agency prohibited substances